Operation Thunderbolt may refer to:
 Operation Donnerkeil or Operation Thunderbolt, a World War II air-support campaign
 Operation Thunderbolt (1951), an offensive operation during the Korean War
 Operation Entebbe or Operation Thunderbolt, a hostage rescue mission in 1976
 Operation Thunderbolt, a mission to rescue hostages from the 1991 Singapore Airlines Flight 117 hijacking
 Operation Thunderbolt (1997), an offensive operation during the Second Sudanese Civil War and First Congo War
 Operation Thunderbolt (2016), a Bangladesh Army Special Forces operation to end the Gulshan hostage crisis
 Operation Thunderbolt (film), a film about Operation Entebbe
 Operation Thunderbolt (video game), a 1988 arcade game by Taito